St George Wharf is a riverside development in Vauxhall, Lambeth, London, England, located on the southern bank of the River Thames beside Vauxhall Bridge. St George Wharf Pier is a calling point for London River Services riverboat RB2 and RB6 services.

The  mixed-use development is located between the Vauxhall Cross road junction and the river, and is near Vauxhall station. The River Effra, one of the Thames' many underground tributaries, empties into the river close by. This development should not be confused with the smaller St George's Wharf which is in Shad Thames, London SE1, close to Tower Bridge.

Construction

Construction of St George Wharf was carried out in phases by developers St George, part of Berkeley Group Holdings, with blocks opening between 2001 and 2010. St George Wharf Tower was the final block to be completed, opening in 2012. The development comprises over 1,400 apartments, as well as offices, retail units and restaurants. It was designed by the architecture practice Broadway Malyan.

St George Wharf comprises the following blocks:

 Admiral House
 Anchor House
 Aquarius House
 Armada House
 Bridge House (18 St George Wharf, SW8 2LP/Q)
 Drake House
 Ensign House (12 St George Wharf, SW8 2LU)
 Flagstaff House
 Fountain House
 Galleon House
 Hamilton House
 Hanover House (7 St George Wharf, SW8 2JA)
 Hobart House
 Jellicoe House
 Kestrel House
 Kingfisher House
 Sentinel Point
 The Tower

St George Wharf Tower is a residential skyscraper. It is cited as the tallest residential building in the United Kingdom, however there are 10 apartments within The Shard, which is taller. Two residential towers currently under construction in London, Newfoundland Quay and Landmark Pinnacle will be taller than the Tower when completed in 2020.

Helicopter crash
At 07:57 GMT on 16 January 2013, a helicopter collided with a crane being used in the construction of the St George Wharf Tower.  The helicopter crashed in nearby Wandsworth Road, killing the pilot. One person on the ground also died, and a number of others were injured.

Carbuncle Cup

In October 2006, St George Wharf was nominated and made the Building Design shortlist for the inaugural Carbuncle Cup, which was ultimately awarded to Drake Circus Shopping Centre in Plymouth.

References

External links

 https://www.bbc.co.uk/news/uk-england-21040410

Buildings and structures in the London Borough of Lambeth
Redeveloped ports and waterfronts in London
Buildings and structures under construction in the United Kingdom
Vauxhall